Long Lake may refer to several lakes in Alberta:

Long Lake (Athabasca County), a lake in Athabasca County, Alberta, Canada
Long Lake (oil sands), an oil sands upgrader project in northeast Alberta, Canada
Long Lake (Thorhild County),  a lake in Thorhild County, Alberta, Canada
Long Lake, Alberta, a hamlet in Thorhild County, Alberta, Canada
Long Lake Provincial Park (Alberta), provincial park in Thorhild County, Alberta, Canada

See also
Long Lake (disambiguation)